Malin Birgitta Barijard Johnsson, born 10 April 1975 in Söderköping, Östergötland, Sweden) is a Swedish equestrian, competing in show jumping. Baryard started to ride at the age of six and went on to be a very accomplished show jumper. She won a gold medal in the Swedish Championships at the age of just 14. She married Swedish TV presenter  in the summer of 2004, and made her TV-presenting debut in the autumn of 2004 on the SVT show Barbacka.

Achievements
In the 1996 Summer Olympics, Baryard placed 49th in the individual competition, and the Swedish team placed 10th. At the 1998 World Equestrian Games, Baryard placed 66th individually and 12th team. At the 2000 Summer Games, she placed 20th individually and 7th in the team competition. At the 2002 World Equestrian Games, she placed 12th individually and the Swedish team placed 2nd overall. At the 2004 Summer Games, Baryard placed 28th, while the Swedish team gained a silver medal overall. At the 2006 World Equestrian Games, Baryard placed 107th individually and 12th team.

Malin Baryard / H&M Butterfly Flip were awarded the 2003 FEI Best Horse and Rider Combination, having placed in the top ten in 21 competitions that year. The duo amassed a total of 1224 points, to finish the rankings 221 points ahead of Ludger Beerbaum / Goldfever 2 and 222 points ahead of Markus Fuchs / Granie. That same year, Baryard placed third in the FEI World Cup Final with Butterfly Flip, in Las Vegas. In addition, the duo placed 7th in 2002, 6th in 2004 and 10th in 2007. Baryard also placed 7th with Corrmint in the 1996 World Cup Final, for a total of five top ten finishes in the event.

In 2021, at the 2020 Summer Olympics, Baryard placed 5th in the Individual jumping events. She won Olympic gold in the team jump event.

Discography
 2004 – Spånka feat. Malin Baryard – Do You Wanna Ride?

References

1975 births
Living people
Swedish show jumping riders
Swedish female equestrians
Olympic equestrians of Sweden
Olympic gold medalists for Sweden
Olympic silver medalists for Sweden
Olympic medalists in equestrian
Medalists at the 2004 Summer Olympics
Medalists at the 2020 Summer Olympics
Equestrians at the 1996 Summer Olympics
Equestrians at the 2000 Summer Olympics
Equestrians at the 2004 Summer Olympics
Equestrians at the 2016 Summer Olympics
Equestrians at the 2020 Summer Olympics
Sportspeople from Norrköping
20th-century Swedish women
21st-century Swedish women